TSS Vienna was a passenger and freight vessel built for the London and North Eastern Railway in 1929.

History

The ship was built by John Brown on Clydebank to replace a ship of the same name  of 1894. She was launched on 10 April 1929 by Lady Barrie, wife of Sir Charles Barrie of Airlie Park, Broughty Ferry. Lady Barrie was given a diamond and emerald brooch by the builders as a memento of the occasion.

On reaching the sinking vessel she took on board 131 passengers and their baggage and transferred them to Antwerp.
 
In 1941 the ship was requisitioned by the Ministry of War Transport and served time in the Mediterranean Sea off Algiers and Bari. In 1945 she returned to become a permanent leave ship for the British Army of the Rhine between Harwich and Hook of Holland.

She was withdrawn in 1960 and scrapped in Ghent.

References

1929 ships
Steamships of the United Kingdom
Ships built on the River Clyde
Ships of the London and North Eastern Railway